Beetles of the genus Helichus are found worldwide apart from in Australia and Antarctica. The larvae are land-dwelling which may be unique in water living insects.

Species
These 12 species belong to the genus Helichus:

 Helichus basalis LeConte, 1852 i c g b
 Helichus bollowi Hinton, 1936 g
 Helichus fastigatus b
 Helichus fastigiatus (Say, 1824) i c g
 Helichus frater Hinton, 1939 g
 Helichus lithophilus (Germar, 1824) i c g b
 Helichus puncticollis Sharp, 1882 i c g
 Helichus pusillus Hinton, 1939 g
 Helichus striatus Leconte, 1852 i c g b
 Helichus substriatus (Müller, 1806) g
 Helichus suturalis Leconte, 1852 i c g b
 Helichus triangularis Musgrave, 1935 i c g

Data sources: i = ITIS, c = Catalogue of Life, g = GBIF, b = Bugguide.net

References

External links

 

Byrrhoidea genera
Dryopidae